Clyde was the official mascot of the 2014 Commonwealth Games in Glasgow. Clyde is an anthropomorphic thistle (the floral emblem of Scotland) and is named after the River Clyde which flows through the centre of Glasgow. The mascot was designed by Beth Gilmour from Cumbernauld, who won a competition run by Glasgow 2014 for children to design the Mascot. Beth's drawing was then brought to life by digital agency Nerv, who turned it into a commercial character, created a full backstory, gave it a name – Clyde – and created a website for him. Clyde was finally revealed in a seven-minute animated film created by Nerv at a ceremony at BBC Scotland's headquarters in Glasgow. The organiser, Glasgow 2014, said the mascot's design was chosen, because of its "Scottish symbolism and Glaswegian charm and likeability".

Clyde was named as the official mascot for Team Scotland at the 2022 Commonwealth Games in Birmingham, England.

Statues

25 life-size Clyde statues were erected at places of public interest across the city including the Glasgow Botanic Gardens, the Kelvingrove Art Gallery and at George Square. However following vandalism at a statue in the Govan area of the city, the statues were taken down. They are expected to be re-erected in secure areas.

Commercial
By the final day of the Games, over 50,000 Clyde mascot cuddly toys had been sold.

Post-Glasgow 2014
Due to popularity in the city, a petition was set up to make Clyde the mascot of City of Glasgow in the aftermath of the Commonwealth Games, the petition gained over 1,500 signatures.

In October 2021, it was announced that Clyde would be the official mascot for Team Scotland at the 2022 Commonwealth Games in Birmingham, England.

See also

List of Commonwealth Games mascots
Borobi (mascot)
Karak (mascot)
Matilda (mascot)
Shera (mascot)
Perry (mascot)

References

External links
 https://web.archive.org/web/20150227141514/http://www.nerv.co.uk/work/glasgow-2014-commonwealth-games/
 http://www.glasgow2014.com/celebrate/mascot

2014 Commonwealth Games
Sport in Glasgow
Scottish mascots
Sports mascots
Commonwealth Games mascots
Mascots introduced in 2014